Christmas Song may refer to:

 Christmas music, music performed or heard around the Christmas season
 "Christmas Song" (Gilbert O'Sullivan song), 1974 song by Gilbert O'Sullivan
 Christmas Song (album), 2007 album by Mannheim Steamroller
 Christmas Song, a 2012 TV film starring Natasha Henstridge 
 "The Christmas Song", 1945 song by Bob Wells and Mel Tormé
 The Christmas Song (Nat King Cole album), or The Magic of Christmas, 1960 album by Nat King Cole
 The Christmas Song (EP), 2014 EP by Jamey Johnson

See also
 Christmas Songs (disambiguation)
 Christmas Album (disambiguation)